Kvíčovice is a municipality and village in Plzeň-South District in the Plzeň Region of the Czech Republic. It has about 400 inhabitants.

Geography
It lies in the Plasy Uplands. The Chuchla Stream flows through the municipality and connects with the Radbuza River on the eastern municipal border.

History
The first written mention of Kvíčovice is from 1379.

From 1 January 2021, Kvíčovice is no longer a part of Domažlice District and belongs to Plzeň-South District.

Notable people
Štěpánka Haničincová (1931–1999), actress, screenwriter and television presenter

References

Villages in Plzeň-South District